The Tinder Swindler is a British true crime documentary film directed by Felicity Morris and  released on Netflix on 2 February 2022. The documentary tells the story of the Israeli conman Simon Leviev (born Shimon Hayut) who used the dating application Tinder to connect with individuals who he then emotionally manipulated into financially supporting his lavish lifestyle on the pretext he needed the money to escape his "enemies."

Plot and background 
An Israeli man, born Shimon Hayut, travelled around Europe, presenting himself as the son of Russian-Israeli diamond mogul Lev Leviev. He used the dating app Tinder to contact women as Simon Leviev, and tricked them into lending him money that he would never repay. He would charm women with lavish gifts and take them to dinners on private jets using money he borrowed from other women he had previously conned. He would later pretend he was being targeted by his "enemies", often sending the same messages and images to each woman, indicating that he had just been attacked with a knife, but that his bodyguard had saved him and was hurt. He then asked his victims to help him financially due to the breach of 'security', supposedly hindering his use of his credit cards and bank accounts; the women would often take out bank loans and new credit cards in order to help. He would then use the money gained through the deception to lure new victims, while essentially operating a Ponzi scheme. Later, he would pretend to repay his victims by sending forged documents showing fake bank transfers and then break off contact with the victims. Sometimes he would go as far as threaten them and use manipulation to get more money from his victims. It is estimated that he swindled $10 million from people across the world.

Reception

Critical response
On Rotten Tomatoes, the film has an approval rating of 96% based on 27 reviews, with an average rating of 7.50/10. The website's critics consensus reads: "Chillingly addictive viewing, The Tinder Swindler offers a solidly crafted – albeit heartbreaking – treat for true crime fans."

Kevin Maher of The Times gave the film 4/5 stars, describing it as "the Jaws of internet dating documentaries" and wrote: "it's so visceral, propulsive and alarming that the prospect of online dating after The Tinder Swindler might seem very foolhardy indeed." Rebecca Nicholson of The Guardian also gave it 4/5 stars, writing: "The Tinder Swindler is snappy and smart and leaves you wanting more, rather than scraping the barrel for every possible angle." Ed Cumming of The Independent also gave it 4/5 stars, saying: "Despite the great yarn at its centre, [the film] sometimes lapses into the self-indulgence common to so many modern documentaries, with endless shadowy reconstructions and a heart-tugging soundtrack."

Brian Lowry of CNN was more critical of the film, writing: "Combining the qualities of a Lifetime movie with a catchy title, the marketable elements scarcely mask that the story is actually kind of a bore."

The movie clocked 45.8 million hours viewed globally across the week 31 January6 February, and hit the top 10 on Netflix in 92 countries.

Awards and nominations

Other responses
The epilogue shown before the end credits states Hayut remains an active member on Tinder. Following the release of the film, however, Tinder permanently banned Hayut from its platform. Match Group, Tinder's parent company, also banned Hayut from its other dating apps: Hinge, Match.com, Plenty of Fish, and OkCupid.

Variety reported on 4 February 2022 that Netflix was planning to make the documentary into a dramatized movie.

Netflix released a special three-part podcast companion that tells about the making of the documentary and digs deeper into Hayut's life and methods.

On 5 February 2022, the three victims set up a GoFundMe fundraiser campaign to compensate their debts.

On 22 February 2022, Piotr Kaluski, introduced to women and depicted in the film as Hayut's bodyguard, sued Netflix for $5.6 million claiming he was portrayed inaccurately.

In late February 2022, Hayut launched an NFT collection and merchandise with images seen and quotes heard in the film.

References

External links

2022 films
2022 documentary films
British documentary films
Documentary films about crime
Films about online dating
True crime
English-language Netflix original films
Netflix original documentary films
2020s English-language films
2020s British films